WLTM may refer to:

Radio stations
 WLTM (FM), a radio station (90.3 FM) licensed to serve Harrisburg, Illinois, United States
 WEBG (FM), a radio station (95.9 FM) licensed to serve Mina, New York, United States, which held the call sign WLTM from December 2017 to September 2020
 WIBT, a radio station (97.9 FM) licensed to serve Greenville, Mississippi, United States, which held the call sign WLTM from April 2010 to February 2017
 WBZW, a radio station (96.7 FM) licensed to serve Peachtree City, Georgia, United States, which held the call sign WLTM from December 2006 to January 2008
 WUBL, a radio station (94.9 FM) licensed to serve Atlanta, Georgia, which held the call sign WLTM from March 2003 to December 2006
 WDKF, a radio station (99.7 FM) licensed to serve Sturgeon Bay, Wisconsin, United States, which held the call sign WLTM from September 1996 to April 2002
 WQQB, a radio station (96.1 FM) licensed to serve Rantoul, Illinois, United States, which held the call sign WLTM from October 1987 to December 1995
 WPFJ, a radio station (1480 AM) licensed to serve Franklin, North Carolina, United States, which held the call sign WLTM until June 1987

Other uses
 Would like to meet, in personal advertisements